Hayward station may refer to:
 Hayward station (British Columbia), a railway station in North Cowichan, Canada
 Hayward station (BART), a rapid transit station in Hayward, California, United States
 Hayward station (Amtrak), an intercity rail station in Hayward, California, United States